The 2014 Wisconsin gubernatorial election took place on November 4, 2014, to determine the governor and lieutenant governor of the U.S. state of Wisconsin. It occurred concurrently with elections to the United States Senate in other states and elections to the United States House of Representatives and various state and local elections.

Incumbent Republican Governor Scott Walker won re-election to a second term in office, defeating Democratic businesswoman and Madison school board member Mary Burke and two minor party candidates in the general election.

Walker, who was elected in 2010, survived an attempted recall in 2012, the first governor in United States history to do so, defeating Democratic nominee Tom Barrett. Wisconsin voters have elected a governor from a different political party than the sitting president in 27 of the last 31 elections since 1932; only once has a Democratic candidate been elected governor in Wisconsin in the last 18 contests when a Democrat was in the White House. Eleven of the last twelve Wisconsin governors, dating back to Republican Vernon Wallace Thomson in the late 1950s, had, unlike Burke, previously won an election to state government, the exception being Republican Lee S. Dreyfus in 1978.

The polling leading up to the election was very close, with no candidate clearly in the lead. The consensus among most analysts was that the race was either a tossup or leaning Republican.

Republican primary

Candidates

Declared 
 Scott Walker, incumbent governor

Results

Democratic primary

Candidates

Declared 
 Mary Burke, businesswoman, member of the Madison school district board and former Wisconsin Secretary of Commerce
 Brett Hulsey, state representative

Disqualified 
 Marcia Mercedes Perkins
 Hari Trivedi, independent candidate for governor in the 2012 recall election

Declined 
 Chris Abele, Milwaukee County Executive
 Tom Barrett, Mayor of Milwaukee and nominee for governor in 2010 and 2012
 Deb Carey, founder and president of New Glarus Brewing Company
 Russ Feingold, former U.S. Senator
 Mark L. Harris, Winnebago County Executive
 Ron Kind, U.S. Representative
 Jon Erpenbach, state senator
 Kathleen Falk, former Dane County Executive and candidate for governor in 2012
 Kathleen Vinehout, state senator and candidate for governor in 2012
 Peter W. Barca, Minority Leader of the Wisconsin State Assembly and former U.S. Representative
 Dave Cieslewicz, former mayor of Madison
 Lori Compas, executive director of the Wisconsin Business Alliance and nominee for the Wisconsin Senate in 2012
 Kevin Conroy, biotechnology executive
 John Dickert, Mayor of Racine
 Dave Hansen, state senator
 Dianne Hesselbein, state representative
 Sara Johann, political activist
 Steve Kagen, former U.S. Representative
 Jessica King, former state senator
 Herb Kohl, former U.S. Senator
 Chris Larson, Minority Leader of the Wisconsin Senate
 Julie Lassa, state senator
 Cory Mason, state representative
 Mahlon Mitchell, president of the Professional Fire Fighters of Wisconsin and nominee for lieutenant governor in 2012
 Gwen Moore, U.S. Representative
 Tom Nelson, Outagamie County Executive and nominee for lieutenant governor in 2010
 Dave Obey, former U.S. Representative
 Joe Parisi, Dane County Executive
 Jennifer Shilling, state senator
 Chris Taylor, state representative

Endorsements

Polling

Results

Third parties and independents

Candidates

Declared 
 Robert Burke (Libertarian Party), founder of the Libertarian Party of Pierce-St. Croix
 Running mate: Joseph Brost
 Dennis Fehr (The People's Party), businessman and founder of The People's Party
 Brett Hulsey (write-in), state representative

Disqualified 
 Francis Klein (Pirate Party)

General election

Predictions

Polling

Results

References

External links 
 Wisconsin gubernatorial election, 2014 at Ballotpedia

Official campaign websites (Archived)
 Scott Walker for Governor
 Mary Burke for Governor
 Robert Burke

gubernatorial
2014
Wisconsin